Martikainen is a Finnish surname. Notable people with the surname include:

 Janne Martikainen (1878–1934), Finnish politician
 Martta Martikainen-Ypyä (1904–1992), Finnish architect
 Olavi Martikainen (born 1941), Finnish farmer and politician
 Kari Martikainen (born 1968), Finnish professional ice hockey defenceman
 Jarkko Martikainen (born 1970), Finnish singer and songwriter
 Tommi Martikainen (born 1982), Finnish racing cyclist

Finnish-language surnames